The New York City Mayor's Committee on Receptions to Distinguished Guests was established on September 6, 1919, to "provide adequate welcome and reception to foreign dignitaries, accredited representatives of European governments and other distinguished guests who may visit New York."

Chairman
Rodman Wanamaker
William Francis Deegan
Grover Aloysius Whalen ? to 1926

References

1919 establishments in New York City
Government of New York City
History of New York City